Jeep trail is a term originating in the United States to designate unpaved roads designed and maintained for use solely by high-clearance four-wheel drive (4WD) vehicles, regardless of the vehicle manufacturer. Only the more difficult unpaved roads are considered jeep trails while gravel or dirt roads passable in conventional vehicles are simply unpaved roads. The word jeep in this usage is normally spelled with all lowercase letters, the brand name of Jeep being just one of many that is drivable on difficult road surfaces.

One of the most well-known jeep trails is the Rubicon Trail located west of Lake Tahoe in California. The town of Ouray, Colorado serves as a hub for four-wheel drive excursions through mountain passes such as Engineer Pass and Cinnamon Passtogether forming the Alpine Loop National Back Country Bywayas well as Imogene Pass and Black Bear Pass. Moab, Utah hosts the famous Easter Jeep Safari and has numerous trails in the surrounding area, including Hell's Revenge, Pritchett Canyon, Metal Masher, Moab Rim, Cliff Hanger and Poison Spider Mesa. Canyonlands National Park contains several 4WD roads including White Rim Road, Elephant Hill and the Doll House. Other national parks, including Arches, Capitol Reef and Death Valley, have 4WD roads leading to various features within their boundaries.

Off-roading
Outdoor recreation
Types of roads